Candy Johnson (February 8, 1944 – October 20, 2012) was an American singer and dancer who appeared in several films in the 1960s.

Biography

She was born on 8 February 1944 as Vicki Jane Husted in Los Angeles County, California to Jeannette 'Jeanne' N. Rathmann and Clarence William Husted. After her mother remarried, she took her stepfather's surname of Johnston. She attended and graduated from San Gabriel High School, in whose yearbooks she is listed simply as "Candy Johnston", and she subsequently changed her name professionally to Candy Johnson. Her mother, who, according to Candy's half-brother Jon Johnston was a dancer in her own right, was herself the sister of two famous Indy 500 racers, Royal 'Jim' Rathmann and Jim 'Dick' Rathmann.

Her most notable films are several beach party productions by American International Pictures, in which she played Candy, a girl who could dance so hard it would literally knock the guys off their feet. In Beach Party (1963) she is credited as the "perpetual motion dancer."  She remained a part of the series for the next three films, with her last appearance being in 1964 in Pajama Party, where she had a small cameo role.

She also recorded under the name "Candy Johnson and her Exciters."  The Exciters were a band her agent (and future husband) Red Gilson managed and partnered her with.  The recordings of Candy and the Exciters were released by Canjo records, a private label started by Johnson and Gilson in 1964 to capitalize on her club and film appearances.  Canjo was in business for only one year and released two albums and seven singles.

She also appeared at the 1964 World's Fair in Flushing, Queens, New York.  After seeing her show, the New York rock group The Strangeloves were inspired to write their hit single "I Want Candy," which reached #11 on the Billboard charts.  The song would be rerecorded by a number of artists over the following decades, including The Tremeloes, Bow Wow Wow and Aaron Carter.

Candy retired from performing in 1968 and subsequently led a private existence, eventually settling in Corona, California.  At the request of friends, she attended a special showing of Beach Party at a Los Angeles theatre in 2006.  When the film ended, the organizer of the event announced to the crowd that Candy was in attendance.  She rose to take a bow and received a standing ovation.

After being diagnosed with brain cancer in May 2012, she remained in a Corona, California convalescent hospital, where she died of the disease in her sleep at age 68 on October 20, 2012.  She was cremated and her remains brought to outer space on 21 June 2013, by the Houston-based extraterrestrial-burial company Celestis.

References

External links
 
 http://www.candyjohnson.com
 Candy Johnson and (the/her) Exciters
 The Candy Johnson Show at Bikini Beach

1944 births
2012 deaths
American women singers
Jazz-blues musicians
American female dancers
Dancers from California
Deaths from brain cancer in the United States
Deaths from cancer in California
Neurological disease deaths in California
21st-century American women